Belluno Airport is an airport located in Belluno, Italy. The airport is also known as Arturo Dell'Oro Airport.

Accidents and incidents

 On March 11, 1967 a de Havilland Canada DHC-6 Twin Otter operated by Aeralpi crashed into a hill while flying from Venice Marco Polo Airport while on approach to Belluno Airport in bad weather.

References 

Transport in Venice
Airports in Italy
Airport
Transport in Veneto
Buildings and structures in the Province of Belluno